Sucre is a municipality of Sucre, Venezuela. The capital is Cumaná.

Name
The municipality is one of several in Venezuela named "Sucre Municipality" in honour of Venezuelan independence hero Antonio José de Sucre.

Municipalities of Sucre (state)